Inder Kumar (26 August 1973 – 28 July 2017) was an Indian actor best known for playing supporting roles in Hindi films such as Wanted, Tumko Na Bhool Paayenge, Kahin Pyaar Na Ho Jaaye and Khiladiyon Ka Khiladi. He was a close friend of Salman Khan and appeared in many films, alongside him. He was last seen in the film Chhoti Si Guzaarish which was directed by Pragyesh Singh. He was shooting for a film titled Phati Padi Hai Yaar at the time of his death.

Personal life 
He was born on 26 August 1973 in a Marwari family in Jaipur as Inder Kumar Saraf. He studied at St. Xavier's High School, Fort and Sardar Vallabhbhai Patel Vidyalaya (both in Mumbai), and completed his graduation. His mentor in movies was film publicist Rajoo Kariya who introduced him to film producers during the early days of his career. He had been married thrice. His first marriage was in 2003 with his mentor Rajoo Kariya's daughter Sonal Kariya and they separated that year after 5 months while his wife was still pregnant with his first daughter Khushi. He dated Isha Koppikar on and off for 11 years. Later he married Kamaljeet Kaur (2009) but soon split within 2 months due to irreconcilable differences. In 2013 he married Pallavi Sarraf with whom he had a daughter, Bhavana (born early 2014).

Film career 
He made his debut with 1996 film Masoom, featuring in over 20 movies in a career lasting over twenty one years. He had a promising start in the 1990s with several notable films as a supporting actor such as Khiladiyon Ka Khiladi (1996), ''Ghoonghat' (1997), Kahin Pyaar Na Ho Jaaye (2000), Gaja Gamini (2000), Maa Tujhhe Salaam (2002) and Tumko Na Bhool Paayenge (2002). He also appeared on television in the Star Plus serial Kyunki Saas Bhi Kabhi Bahu Thi playing the part of Mihir Virani opposite Smriti Irani in 2002.

His career had started to suffer when he was bedridden for five years due to a broken vertebra from a helicopter fall while doing his own stunt on the set of the film Maseeha in 2002. After a hiatus he returned to acting appearing in the Bengali film Agnipath in 2005 which flopped. After several flops, he attempted a comeback in 2009 with his role as Salman Khan's friend in Wanted which was a blockbuster hit.

Controversies 
On 25 April 2014, Kumar was arrested by the Versova police, after a 22-year-old female model and aspiring actress registered an FIR alleging that he had raped and assaulted her with a promise of a role in movies. He claimed it was a consensual relationship and she was seeking revenge after he ended the relationship and went back to his wife. People of Bollywood distanced themselves from him and he was left with no friends, money or career when his daughter was only 15 months old. He was charged under sections 376 (rape), 324 (causing grievous hurt), and 506 (criminal intimidation) of the Indian Penal Code.  On 9 May, the police asserted that the medical reports supported that the woman had been raped as well as assaulted. Kumar denied the allegations saying that he had a consensual relationship with the woman. His wife Pallavi defended him fiercely in public with a statement that he slipped up by having a consensual fling and during two days of incidents the claimant was freely moving in and out of her home alone in a cheerful mood to order food and buy alcohol to party at home with Inder. Inder apologized for leaving his wife for a short fling and he returned to his family. Subsequent to that, Kumar was granted bail on 10 June. The woman who accused him was arrested by police on 1 August 2014 in an unrelated case for robbing her sister's residence in the same locality of jewellery worth INR 10 lakh.

Death
On 28 July 2017, Inder Kumar died after a cardiac arrest at his residence in Four Bungalows neighborhood of Andheri in Mumbai around 12.30 am and he was officially pronounced dead by 4 am.

Filmography

Television

References

External links
 
 
 Inder's wife defends him against rape charges

1972 births
2017 deaths
Male actors in Hindi cinema
Indian male film actors
Male actors from Jaipur
20th-century Indian male actors
21st-century Indian male actors
Indian male television actors